Jacobitism was a political movement that supported the restoration of the senior line of the House of Stuart to the British throne. The name derives from the first name of James II and VII, which in Latin translates as Jacobus. When James went into exile after the November 1688 Glorious Revolution, the Parliament of England argued that he had abandoned the English throne, which they offered to his Protestant daughter Mary II, and her husband William III. In April, the Scottish Convention held that he "forfeited" the throne of Scotland by his actions, listed in the Articles of Grievances.

The Revolution thus created the principle of a contract between monarch and people, which if violated meant the monarch could be removed. Jacobites argued monarchs were appointed by God, or divine right, and could not be removed, making the post-1688 regime illegitimate. While this was the most consistent difference, Jacobitism was a complex mix of ideas, many opposed by the Stuarts themselves; in Ireland, it meant tolerance for Catholicism, which James supported, but it also meant granting Irish autonomy and reversing the 17th-century land settlements, both of which he opposed. In 1745, clashes between Prince Charles and Scottish Jacobites over the 1707 Union and divine right were central to the internal conflicts that ended it as a viable movement.

Outside Ireland, Jacobitism was strongest in the western Scottish Highlands, Perthshire and Aberdeenshire, and areas of Northern England with a high proportion of Catholics such as western Lancashire, Northumberland and County Durham. Sympathisers were also present in parts of Wales, the West Midlands and South West England, to some degree overlapping with areas that were strongly Royalist during the Wars of the Three Kingdoms. The movement had an international dimension; several European powers sponsored the Jacobites as an extension of larger conflicts, while many Jacobite exiles served in foreign armies.

In addition to the 1689–1691 Williamite War in Ireland and the Jacobite rising of 1689 in Scotland, there were serious revolts in 1715, 1719 and 1745; abortive French-backed invasion attempts in 1708 and 1744; and several unsuccessful plots. While the 1745 rising briefly threatened the Hanoverian monarchy and forced the recall of British troops from Continental Europe, its collapse and withdrawal of French support in 1748 ended Jacobitism as a serious political movement.

Political background 

Jacobite ideology originated with James VI and I, first monarch of England, Scotland and Ireland in 1603. Its basis was divine right, which claimed his authority came from God, and the crown's descent by indefeasible hereditary right: James and his supporters emphasised his right to the throne by blood to forestall controversy over his appointment by Elizabeth I as her successor. Personal rule by the monarch eliminated the need for Parliaments, and required political and religious union, concepts widely unpopular in all three kingdoms.

"Divine right" also clashed with Catholic allegiance to the Pope and with Protestant nonconformists, since both argued there was an authority above the king. The 17th century belief that 'true religion' and 'good government' were one and the same meant disputes in one area fed into the other; Millenarianism and belief in the imminence of the Second Coming meant many Protestants viewed such issues as urgent and real.

As the first step towards union, James began standardising religious practices between the churches of England, Scotland and Ireland. After his death in 1625, this was continued by his son Charles I, who lacked his political sensitivity; by the late 1630s, instituting Personal Rule in 1629, enforcing Laudian reforms on the Church of England, and ruling without Parliament led to a political crisis. Similar measures in Scotland caused the 1639–1640 Bishops' Wars, and installation of a Covenanter government.

Organised by a small group of Catholic nobility, the October 1641 Irish Rebellion was the cumulative effect of land confiscation, loss of political control, anti-Catholic measures and economic decline. Intended as a bloodless coup, its leaders quickly lost control, leading to atrocities on both sides. In May, a Covenanter army landed in Ulster to support Scots settlers; although Charles and Parliament both supported raising an army to suppress the rebellion, neither trusted the other with its control, tensions that ultimately led to the outbreak of the First English Civil War in August 1642.

In 1642, the Catholic Confederacy representing the Irish insurgents proclaimed allegiance to Charles, but the Stuarts were an unreliable ally, since concessions in Ireland cost them Protestant support in all three kingdoms. In addition, the Adventurers' Act, approved by Charles in March 1642, funded suppression of the revolt by confiscating land from Irish Catholics, much of it owned by members of the Confederacy. The result was a three-way contest between the Confederacy, Royalist forces under the Protestant Duke of Ormond, and a Covenanter-led army in Ulster. The latter were increasingly at odds with the English government; after Charles' execution in January 1649, Ormond combined these factions to resist the 1649 to 1652 Cromwellian conquest of Ireland.

Charles II repudiated his alliance with the Confederacy, in return for Scottish support in the Third English Civil War, and Ormond went into exile in 1650. Defeat in 1652 led to the mass confiscation of Catholic and Royalist land, and its re-distribution among English Parliamentary soldiers and Protestant settlers. The three kingdoms were combined into the Commonwealth of England, regaining their separate status when the monarchy was restored in 1660.

Charles's reign was dominated by the expansionist policies of Louis XIV of France, seen as a threat to Protestant Europe. When his brother and heir James announced his conversion to Catholicism in 1677, an attempt was made to bar him from the English throne. Nevertheless, he became king in February 1685 with widespread support in England and Scotland; a Catholic monarch was preferable to excluding the 'natural heir', and rebellions by Protestant dissidents quickly suppressed. It was also viewed as temporary; James was 52, his second marriage was childless after 11 years, and his Protestant daughter Mary was heir.

His religion made James popular among Irish Catholics, whose position had not improved under his brother. By 1685, Catholic land ownership had fallen to 22%, versus 90% in 1600, and after 1673, a series of proclamations deprived them of the right to bear arms or hold public office. The Catholic Richard Talbot, 1st Earl of Tyrconnell was appointed Lord Deputy of Ireland in 1687, and began building a Catholic establishment that could survive James. Fearing a short reign, Tyrconnell moved at a speed that destabilised all three kingdoms.

James dismissed the English and Scottish Parliaments when they refused to approve his measures of religious tolerance, which he enforced using the Royal Prerogative. Doing so threatened to re-open disputes over religion, reward those who rebelled in 1685 and undermine his own supporters. It also ignored the impact of the 1685 Edict of Fontainebleau, which revoked tolerance for French Protestants and created an estimated 400,000 refugees, 40,000 of whom settled in London. Two events turned discontent into rebellion, the first being the birth of James's son on 10 June 1688, which created the prospect of a Catholic dynasty. The second was James' prosecution of the Seven Bishops, which seemed to go beyond tolerance for Catholicism and actively attack the Church of England; their acquittal on 30 June caused widespread rejoicing throughout England and Scotland, and destroyed James's political authority.

In 1685, many feared civil war if James were bypassed; by 1688, even the Earl of Sunderland, his chief minister, felt only his removal could prevent it. Sunderland secretly co-ordinated an Invitation to William, assuring Mary and her husband William of Orange of English support for armed intervention. William landed in Brixham on 5 November with 14,000 men; as he advanced, James's army deserted and he went into exile on 23 December. In February 1689, the English Parliament appointed William and Mary joint monarchs of England, while the Scots followed suit in March.

Most of Ireland was still controlled by Tyrconnell, where James landed on 12 March 1689 with 6,000 French troops. The 1689-to-1691 Williamite War in Ireland highlighted two recurring trends; for James and his successors, the main prize was England, with Ireland and Scotland secondary to that, while the primary French objective was to absorb British resources, not necessarily restore the Stuarts. Elections in May 1689 produced the first Irish Parliament with a Catholic majority since 1613. It repealed the Cromwellian land seizures, confiscated land from Williamites, and proclaimed Ireland a 'distinct kingdom from England', measures annulled after defeat in 1691.

A Jacobite rising in Scotland achieved some initial success but was ultimately suppressed. Several days after the Irish Jacobites were defeated at The Battle of the Boyne in July 1690, victory at Beachy Head gave the French temporary control of the English Channel. James returned to France to urge an immediate invasion of England, but the Anglo-Dutch fleet soon regained maritime supremacy, and the opportunity was lost.

The Irish Jacobites and their French allies were finally defeated at the battle of Aughrim in 1691, and the Treaty of Limerick ended the war in Ireland; future risings on behalf of the exiled Stuarts were confined to England and Scotland. The 1701 Act of Settlement barred Catholics from the English throne, and when Anne became the last Stuart monarch in 1702, her heir was her Protestant cousin Sophia of Hanover, not her Catholic half-brother James. Ireland retained a separate Parliament until 1800, but the 1707 Union combined England and Scotland into the Kingdom of Great Britain. Anne viewed this as the unified Protestant kingdom which her predecessors had failed to achieve.

The exiled Stuarts continued to agitate for a return to power, based on the support they retained within the three kingdoms of England, Scotland and Ireland. Doing so required external help, most consistently supplied by France, while Spain backed the 1719 Rising. While talks were also held at different times with Sweden, Prussia, and Russia, these never produced concrete results. Although the Stuarts were useful as a lever, their foreign backers generally had little interest in their restoration.

Ideology
Historian Frank McLynn identifies seven primary drivers in Jacobitism, noting that while the movement contained "sincere men [..] who aimed solely to restore the Stuarts", it "provided a source of legitimacy for political dissent of all kinds". Establishing the ideology of active participants is complicated by the fact that "by and large, those who wrote most did not act, and those who acted wrote little, if anything."  Later historians have characterised Jacobitism in a variety of ways, including as a revolutionary extension of anti-court ideology; an aristocratic reaction against a growth in executive power; feudal opposition to the growth of capitalism; or as a product of nationalist feeling in Scotland and Ireland.

Jacobitism's main ideological tenets drew on a political theology shared by Non-juring High church Anglicans and Scots Episcopalians. They were, firstly, the divine right of kings, their accountability to God, not man or Parliament; secondly that monarchy was a divine institution; thirdly, the crown's descent by indefeasible hereditary right, which could not be overturned or annulled; and lastly the scriptural injunction of passive obedience and non-resistance, even towards monarchs of which the individual subject might disapprove.

Jacobite propagandists argued such divinely sanctioned authority was the main moral safeguard of society, while its absence led to party strife. They claimed the 1688 Revolution had allowed self-interested minorities, such as Whigs, religious dissenters, and foreigners, to take control of the state and oppress the common people. However, views on the 'correct' balance of rights and duties between monarch and subject varied, and Jacobites attempted to distinguish between 'arbitrary' and 'absolute' power. Non-juring Church of Ireland clergyman Charles Leslie was perhaps the most extreme divine right theorist, but even he argued the monarch was bound by "his oath to God, as well as his promise to his people" and "the laws of justice and honour". Another common theme in Jacobite pamphlets was the implication that economic or other upheavals in the British Isles were punishment for ejecting a divinely appointed monarch, although after 1710, pamphlet writers instead began blaming the "malevolent" Whig political party for exiling the Stuarts, rather than the nation collectively.

Such sentiments were not always consistently held within the Jacobite community, or restricted to Jacobites alone: many Whigs and Church of England clergy also argued the post 1688 succession was "divinely ordained". After the Act of Settlement, Jacobite propagandists deemphasised the purely legitimist elements in their writing and by 1745, active promotion of hereditary and indefeasible right was restricted largely to a few Scots Episcopalians such as Lords Pitsligo and Balmerino.

Instead they began to focus on populist themes such as opposition to a standing army, electoral corruption and social injustice. By the 1750s, Charles himself promised triennial parliaments, disbanding the army and legal guarantees on freedom of the press. Such tactics broadened their appeal but also carried risks, since they could always be undercut by a government prepared to offer similar concessions. The ongoing Stuart focus on England and regaining a united British throne led to tensions with their broader-based supporters in 1745, when the primary goal of most Scots Jacobites was ending the 1707 Union. This meant that following victory at Prestonpans in September, they preferred to negotiate, rather than invade England as Charles wanted.

More generally, Jacobite theorists reflected a broader conservative current in Enlightenment thought, appealing to those attracted to a monarchist solution to perceived modern decadence. Populist songs and tracts presented the Stuarts as capable of correcting a wide range of ills and restoring social harmony, as well as contrasting Dutch and Hanoverian "foreigners" with a man who even in exile continued to consume English beef and beer. While particularly calculated to appeal to Tories, the wide range of themes adopted by Jacobite pamphleteers and agents periodically drew in disaffected Whigs and former radicals. Such "Whig-Jacobites" were highly valued by the exiled court, although many viewed James II as a potentially weak king from whom it would be easy to extract concessions in the event of a restoration.

Jacobite supporters in the three kingdoms

Ireland
The role of Jacobitism in Irish political history is debated; some argue that it was a broad-based popular movement and the main driver of Irish Catholic nationalism between 1688 and 1795. Others see it as part of "a pan-British movement, rooted in confessional and dynastic loyalties", very different from 19th-century Irish nationalism. Historian Vincent Morely describes Irish Jacobitism as a distinctive ideology within the broader movement that "emphasised the Milesian ancestry of the Stuarts, their loyalty to Catholicism, and Ireland's status as a kingdom with a Crown of its own." In the first half of the 18th century, Jacobitism was "the primary allegiance of politically conscious Catholics".

Irish Catholic support for James was predicated on his religion and assumed willingness to deliver their demands. In 1685, Gaelic poet Dáibhí Ó Bruadair celebrated his accession as ensuring the supremacy of Catholicism and the Irish language. Tyrconnell's expansion of the army by the creation of Catholic regiments was welcomed by Diarmuid Mac Carthaigh, as enabling the native Irish 'Tadhg' to be armed and to assert his dominance over "John" the English Protestant. Conversely, most Irish Protestants viewed his policies as designed to "utterly ruin the Protestant interest and the English interest in Ireland". This restricted Protestant Jacobitism to "doctrinaire clergymen, disgruntled Tory landowners and Catholic converts", who opposed Catholicism but still viewed James' removal as unlawful. A few Church of Ireland ministers refused to swear allegiance to the new regime and became Non-Jurors, the most famous being propagandist Charles Leslie.

Since regaining England was his primary objective, James viewed Ireland as a strategic dead-end but Louis XIV of France argued it was the best place to launch a war, since the administration was controlled by Tyrconnell and his cause popular among the majority Catholic population. James landed at Kinsale in March 1689 and in May called the first Parliament of Ireland since 1666, primarily seeking taxes to fund the war effort. Tyrconnell ensured a predominantly Catholic electorate and candidates by issuing new borough charters, admitting Catholics into city corporations, and removing "disloyal members". Since elections were not held in many northern areas, the Irish House of Commons was 70 members short, and 224 out of 230 MPs were Catholic.

Known to 19th century Irish historians as the "Patriot Parliament", it opened by proclaiming James as the rightful king and condemning the "treasonous subjects" who had ousted him. There were some divisions among Irish Jacobites on the issue of returning all Catholic lands confiscated in 1652 after the Cromwellian conquest of Ireland. The majority of the Irish House of Commons wanted the 1652 Cromwellian Act of Settlement repealed in its entirety, with ownership returned to that prevailing in 1641. This was opposed by a minority within the Catholic elite who had benefited from the 1662 Act of Settlement, a group that included James himself, Tyrconnell and other members of the Irish House of Lords. Instead, they suggested those dispossessed in the 1650s should be restored to half their estates and paid compensation for the remainder. However, with the Commons overwhelmingly in favour of complete restoration, Tyrconnell persuaded the Lords to approve the bill.

More serious were differences between Parliament and James, who resisted any measures that might "dissatisfy his Protestant subjects" in England and Scotland. These conflicted with the demands of the Irish Parliament, which in addition to land restoration included toleration for Catholicism and Irish autonomy. A French diplomat observed James had 'a heart too English to do anything that might vex the English.' He therefore resisted measures that might "dissatisfy his Protestant subjects" in England and Scotland, complaining "he was fallen into the hands of a people who would ram many hard things down his throat". When it became clear Parliament would only vote war taxes if he met their minimum demands, James reluctantly gave his assent to Tyrconnell's land bill and passed a Bill of attainder, confiscating estates from 2,000 mostly Protestant "rebels". Although he also approved Parliament's resolution that Ireland was a "distinct kingdom" and laws passed in England did not apply there, he refused to abolish Poynings' Law, which required Irish legislation be approved by the English Parliament.

Despite his own Catholicism, James viewed the Protestant Church of Ireland as an important part of his support base; he insisted on retaining its legal pre-eminence, although agreeing landowners would only have to pay tithes to clergy of their own religion. However, the price for these concessions was to largely remove the Protestant element from Irish Jacobitism, which thereafter became almost entirely a Catholic ideology. After 1690, Irish Jacobites were also split between Tyrconnell's 'Peace party' who continued to seek a negotiated solution, and a 'War party' led by Patrick Sarsfield who favoured fighting on to the end.

James left Ireland after defeat at the Boyne in 1690, telling his supporters to "shift for themselves". This led some to depict him as "Séamus an chaca", "James of the shit", who had deserted his loyal followers. However, Gaelic scholar Breandán Ó Buachalla claims his reputation subsequently recovered as "the rightful king...destined to return' and upper-class Irish Jacobite writers like Charles O'Kelly and Nicholas Plunkett blamed "corrupt English and Scottish advisors" for his apparent desertion.

After 1691, measures passed by the 1689 Parliament were annulled, penal laws barred Catholics from public life, while the Act of Attainder was used to justify further land confiscations. 12,000 Jacobite soldiers went into exile in the diaspora known as the Flight of the Wild Geese, the majority of whom were later absorbed into the French Irish Brigade. About 1,000 men were recruited for the French and Spanish armies annually, many with a "tangible commitment to the Stuart cause". Elements of the French Irish Brigade participated in the Scottish Jacobite rising of 1745.

Irish-language poets, especially in Munster, continued to champion the cause after James' death; in 1715, Eoin O Callanain described his son James Francis Edward Stuart as "taoiseach na nGaoidheal" or "chieftain of the Gaels". As in England, throughout the 1720s, James' birthday on 10 June was marked by celebrations in Dublin, and towns like Kilkenny and Galway. These were often accompanied by rioting, suggested as proof of popular pro-Jacobite sympathies. Others argue riots were common in 18th-century urban areas and see them as a "series of ritualised clashes".

Combined with Jacobite rhetoric and symbolism among rapparees or bandits, some historians claim this provides evidence of continuing popular support for a Stuart restoration. Other however argue that it is hard to discern "how far rhetorical Jacobitism reflected support for the Stuarts, as opposed to discontent with the status quo". Nevertheless, fears of resurgent Catholic Jacobitism among the ruling Protestant minority meant anti-Catholic Penal Laws remained in place for most of the eighteenth century.

There was no Irish rising in either 1715 or 1745 to accompany those in England and Scotland; one suggestion is after 1691, for various reasons Irish Jacobites looked to European allies, rather than relying on a domestic revolt. From the 1720s on, many Catholics were willing to swear loyalty to the Hanoverian regime, but not the Oath of Abjuration, which required renouncing the authority of the Pope, as well as the Stuarts. After the effective demise of the Jacobite cause in the 1750s, many Catholic gentry withdrew support from the Stuarts. Instead, they created organisations like the Catholic Convention, which worked within the existing state for redress of Catholic grievances. When Charles died in 1788, Irish nationalists looked for alternative liberators, among them the French First Republic, Napoleon Bonaparte and Daniel O'Connell.

England and Wales 
In England and Wales, Jacobitism was often associated with the Tories, many of whom supported James's right to the throne during the Exclusion Crisis. Tory ideology implied that neither "time nor statute law [...] could ameliorate the sin of usurpation", while shared Tory and Jacobite themes of divine right and sacred kingship may have provided an alternative to Whig concepts of "liberty and property". A minority of academics, including Eveline Cruickshanks, have argued that until the late 1750s, the Tories were a crypto-Jacobite party, others that Jacobitism was a "limb of Toryism". However, the supremacy of the Church of England was also central to Tory ideology and James lost their support when his policies seemed to threaten that primacy. The Act of Settlement 1701 excluding Catholics from the English throne was passed by a Tory administration; for the vast majority, Stuart Catholicism was an insuperable barrier to active support, while the Tory doctrine of non-resistance also discouraged them from supporting the exiles against a reigning monarch.

For most of the period from 1690 to 1714, Parliament was either controlled by the Tories, or evenly split with the Whigs; when George I succeeded Anne, most hoped to reconcile with the new regime. The Earl of Mar, who led the 1715 rising, observed "Jacobitisme, which they used to brand the Tories with, is now I presum out of doors". However, George blamed the 1710 to 1714 Tory government for the Peace of Utrecht, which he viewed as damaging to his home state of Hanover. His isolation of former Tory ministers like Lord Bolingbroke and the Earl of Mar drove them first into opposition, then exile. Their exclusion from power between 1714 and 1742 led many Tories to remain in contact with the Jacobite court, which they saw as a potential tool for changing or pressuring the existing government.

In 1715, there were co-ordinated celebrations on 29 May, Restoration Day, and 10 June, James Stuart's birthday, especially in Tory-dominated towns like Bristol, Oxford, Manchester and Norwich, although they remained quiet in the 1715 Rising. In the 1730s, many 'Jacobite' demonstrations in Wales and elsewhere were driven by local tensions, especially hostility to Methodism, and featured attacks on Nonconformist chapels. Most English participants in 1715 came from traditionally Catholic areas in the Northwest, like Lancashire. By 1720, there were fewer than 115,000 in England and Wales, and most remained loyal in 1745, including the Duke of Norfolk, head of the English Catholic community, sentenced to death for his role in 1715 but pardoned. Even so, sympathies were complex; Norfolk's agent Andrew Blood joined the Manchester Regiment, and he later employed another ex-officer, John Sanderson, as his master of horse. English Catholics continued to provide the exiles with financial support well into the 1770s.

In 1689, around 2% of clergy in the Church of England refused to take the oath of allegiance to William and Mary; one list identifies a total of 584 clergy, schoolmasters and university dons as Non Jurors.  This almost certainly understates their numbers, since many sympathisers remained within the Church of England, but Non Jurors were disproportionately represented in Jacobite risings and riots, and provided many "martyrs". By the late 1720s, arguments over doctrine and the death of its originators reduced the church to a handful of scattered congregations, but several of those executed in 1745 came from Manchester, the last significant assembly in England.

Quaker leader William Penn was a prominent non-conformist supporter of James, although this was based on their personal relationship and did not survive his deposition. Another element in English Jacobitism was a handful of disaffected radicals, for whom the exiled Stuarts provided a potential alternative to the Whig establishment. An example was John Matthews, a Jacobite printer executed in 1719; his pamphlet Vox Populi vox Dei emphasised the Lockean theory of the social contract, a doctrine very few Tories of the period would have supported.

Scotland 
Scottish Jacobitism had wider and more extensive roots than in England. 20,000 Scots fought for the Jacobites in 1715, compared to 11,000 who joined the government army, and were the majority of the 9,000 to 14,000 who served in 1745. One reason was the persistence of feudalism in parts of rural Scotland, where tenants could be compelled to provide their landlords with military service. Many of the Highland clansmen who were a feature of Jacobite armies were raised this way: in all three major risings, the bulk of the rank and file were supplied by a small number of north-western clans whose leaders joined the rebellion.

Despite this, many Jacobites were Protestant Lowlanders, rather than the Catholic, Gaelic-speaking Highlanders of legend. By 1745, fewer than 1% of Scots were Catholic, restricted to the far north-west and a few noble families. The majority of the rank and file, as well as many Jacobite leaders, belonged to Protestant Episcopalian congregations. Throughout the 17th century, the close connection between Scottish politics and religion meant changes of regime were accompanied by the losers being expelled from the kirk. In 1690, over 200 clergy lost their positions, mostly in Aberdeenshire and Banffshire, a strongly Episcopalian area since the 1620s. In 1745, around 25% of Jacobite recruits came from this part of the country.

Episcopalianism was popular among social conservatives, as it emphasised indefeasible hereditary right, absolute obedience, and implied deposition of the senior Stuart line was a breach of natural order. The church continued to offer prayers for the Stuarts until 1788, while many refused to swear allegiance to the Hanoverians in 1714. However, even in 1690, a substantial minority accommodated to the new regime, a number that increased significantly after the establishment of the Scottish Episcopal Church in 1712.

Episcopalian ministers, such as Professor James Garden of Aberdeen, presented the 1707 Union as one in a series of disasters to befall Scotland, provoked by "the sins [...] of rebellion, injustice, oppression, schism and perjury". Opposition was boosted by measures imposed by the post-1707 Parliament of Great Britain, including the Treason Act 1708, the 1711 ruling that barred Scots peers with English or British peerages from their seats in the House of Lords, and tax increases. Despite their own preferences, the Stuarts tried to appeal to this group; in 1745, Charles issued declarations dissolving the "pretended Union", despite concerns this would alienate his English supporters.

However, opposition to post-Union legislation was not restricted to Jacobites. Many Presbyterians opposed the establishment of the Episcopal Church in 1712 and other measures of indulgence, while the worst tax riots took place in Glasgow, a town noted for its antipathy to the Stuarts. As in England, some objected less to the Union than the Hanoverian connection; Lord George Murray, a senior Jacobite commander in 1745, was a Unionist who repeatedly disagreed with Charles, but opposed "wars [...] on account of the Electors of Hanover".

Community

While Jacobite agents continued in their attempts to recruit the disaffected, the most committed Jacobites were often linked by relatively small family networks, particularly in Scotland; Jacobite activities in areas like Perthshire and Aberdeenshire centred on a limited number of influential families heavily involved in 1715 and 1745.

Some of the most powerful landowning families preserved their establishment loyalties, but maintained traditions of Stuart allegiance by permitting younger sons to become involved in active Jacobitism; in 1745, Lewis Gordon was widely believed to be a proxy for his brother, the Duke of Gordon. Many Jacobite leaders were closely linked to each other and the exile community by marriage or blood. This has led some historians, notably Bruce Lenman, to characterise the Jacobite risings as French-backed coup attempts by a small network drawn from the elite, though this view is not universally accepted.

Family traditions of Jacobite sympathy were reinforced through objects such as inscribed glassware or rings with hidden symbols, although many of those that survive are in fact 19th century neo-Jacobite creations. Other family heirlooms contained reference to executed Jacobite martyrs, for which the movement preserved an unusual level of veneration. Tartan cloth, widely adopted by the Jacobite army in 1745, was used in portraiture as a symbol of Stuart sympathies, even before the Rising. Outside elite social circles, the Jacobite community circulated propaganda and symbolic objects through a network of clubs, print-sellers and pedlars, aimed at the provincial gentry and middling sort. In 1745, Prince Charles ordered commemorative medals and miniature pictures for clandestine distribution.

Among the more visible elements of the Jacobite community were drinking clubs established in the early 18th century, such as the Scottish Bucks Club or the "Cycle of the White Rose", led by Welsh Tory Sir Watkin Williams-Wynn. Others included the "Sea Serjeants", largely composed of South Wales gentry or the "Independent Electors of Westminster" led by the Glamorganshire lawyer David Morgan, executed for his role in 1745. Other than Morgan, the vast majority of their members took no part in the 1745 Rising; Charles later said "I will do for the Welsh Jacobites what they did for me. I will drink their health".

Oak Apple Day on 29 May commemorated Charles II and was an occasion for displays of Stuart sympathy, as was "White Rose Day", the Old Pretender's birthday on 10 June. Symbols were commonly employed by Jacobites, since they could not be prosecuted for their use, the most common being the White rose of York, adopted after 1688 for reasons now unclear. Various origins have been suggested, including its use as an ancient Scottish royal device, its association with James II as Duke of York, or Charles I being styled as the "White King". Jacobite military units often used plain white standards or cockades, while green ribbons were another recognised Stuart symbol despite their association with the Whig Green Ribbon Club.

Post-1745 decline
Despite being greeted as a hero on his return to Paris, Charles' reception behind the scenes was more muted. D’Éguilles, unofficial French envoy to the Jacobites, had a low opinion of him and other senior Jacobites, describing Lochgarry as "a bandit", and suggesting George Murray was a British spy. For their part, the Scots were disillusioned by lack of meaningful English or French support, despite constant assurances of both. Events also highlighted the reality that a low level, ongoing insurgency was far more cost-effective for the French than a restoration, a form of warfare potentially devastating to the local populace. By exposing the divergence between Scottish, French and Stuart objectives, as well as the lack of support in England, the 1745 Rising ended Jacobitism as a viable political alternative in England and Scotland.

The British authorities enacted a series of measures designed to prevent the Scottish Highlands being used for another rising. New forts were built, the military road network finally completed and William Roy made the first comprehensive survey of the Highlands. Much of the power held by the Highland chiefs derived from their ability to require military service from their clansmen and even before 1745 the clan system had been under severe stress due to changing economic conditions; the Heritable Jurisdictions Act removed such feudal controls by Highland chiefs. This was far more significant than the better-known Act of Proscription which outlawed Highland dress unless worn in military service: its impact is debated and the law was repealed in 1782.

As early as 1745, the French were struggling with the costs of the War of the Austrian Succession, and in June 1746, they began peace negotiations with Britain at Breda. Victories in Flanders in 1747 and 1748 actually worsened their position by drawing in the previously neutral Dutch Republic, whose shipping they relied on to avoid the British naval blockade. By 1748, food shortages among the French population made peace a matter of urgency, but the British refused to sign the Treaty of Aix-la-Chapelle while Charles remained in France. After he ignored requests to leave, the French lost patience; in December 1748, he was briefly jailed before being deported.

In June 1747, his brother Henry became a Catholic priest; since Charles had no legitimate heir, this was seen as tacit acceptance by their father James that the Jacobite cause was finished. Charles continued to explore options for a rising in England, including his conversion to Anglicanism, a proposal that had outraged his father James when previously suggested. He "secretly" visited London in 1750 to meet supporters, and was inducted into the Non Juror church. However, the decline of Jacobitism is demonstrated by the fact the government and George II were well aware of his presence and did nothing to intervene. The English Jacobites made it clear they would do nothing without foreign backing, which despite Charles's overtures to Frederick II of Prussia seemed unlikely.

A plot to capture or assassinate George II, headed by Alexander Murray of Elibank, was betrayed to the government by Alastair Ruadh MacDonnell, or "Pickle the Spy", but not before Charles had sent two exiles as agents. One was Archibald Cameron, responsible for recruiting the Cameron regiment in 1745, who was allegedly betrayed by his own clansmen and executed on 7 June 1753. In a 1754 dispute with the English conspirators, a drunken and increasingly desperate Charles threatened to publish their names for having "betrayed" him; most remaining English sympathisers now left the cause.

During the Seven Years' War in 1759, Charles met Choiseul, then Chief minister of France to discuss another invasion, but Choiseul dismissed him as "incapacitated by drink". The Jacobite cause was abandoned by the French, while British supporters stopped providing funds; Charles, who had returned to Catholicism, now relied on the Papacy to fund his lifestyle. However, with the death of Charles's father in 1766, the Hanoverians received the Pope's  recognition. Despite Henry's urgings, Clement XIII refused to recognise his brother as Charles III; Charles died of a stroke in Rome in January 1788, a disappointed and embittered man.

Following Charles's death, Scottish Catholics swore allegiance to the House of Hanover, and resolved two years later to pray for King George by name. The Stuart claim passed to Henry, now a Cardinal, who styled himself King Henry IX of England. After falling into financial difficulty during the French Revolution, he was granted a stipend by George III. However, his refusal to renounce his claim to be 'Henry IX' prevented a full reconciliation with the House of Hanover.

During the Irish Rebellion of 1798, headed by the United Irishmen with French support, the Directory suggested making Henry King of the Irish. They hoped this would attract support from the Catholic Irish and lead to the creation of a stable pro-French client state. Wolfe Tone, the Protestant republican leader, rejected the suggestion, and a short-lived Irish Republic was proclaimed instead.

Following the death of Henry in 1807, the Jacobite claim passed to those excluded by the 1701 Act of Settlement. From 1807 to 1840, it was held by the House of Savoy, then the House of Habsburg-Lorraine until 1919, while the current Jacobite heir is Franz, Duke of Bavaria, from the House of Wittelsbach. However, neither he nor any of his predecessors since 1807 have pursued their claim. Henry, Charles and James are memorialised in the Monument to the Royal Stuarts in the Vatican.

Analysis 
Traditional Whig historiography viewed Jacobitism as marginal to the progression towards present-day Parliamentary democracy, taking the view that as it was defeated, it could never have won. Representing "pre-industrial paternalism" and "mystical loyalism" against forward-thinking individualism, this conception of Jacobitism was reinforced by Macaulay's stereotype of the typical "Tory-Jacobite squire" as a "bigoted, ignorant, drunken philistine".

More recent analyses, such as that of J. C. D. Clark, suggest that Jacobitism can instead be regarded as part of a "deep vein of social and political conservatism running throughout British history", arguing that the Whig settlement was not as stable as has been depicted. Further interest in Jacobite studies has been prompted by a reassessment of the nationalist aspirations of Scots Jacobites in particular, emphasising its place as part of an ongoing political idea.

Romantic revival 
As the political danger of Jacobitism receded, the movement was increasingly viewed as a romantic symbol of the past, particularly the final rebellion. Relics and mementoes of 1745 were preserved, and Charles himself celebrated in "increasingly emotional language". This memorialising tendency was reinforced by the publication in the 1830s of selections from The Lyon in Mourning by Robert Forbes (1708–1775), a collection of source material and interviews with Jacobite participants in the 1745 rising.

19th century historiography often presented Scottish Jacobites as primarily driven by a romantic attachment to the Stuarts, rather than the reality of individuals with disparate motives. This suited the Victorian depiction of Highlanders as a "martial race", distinguished by a tradition of a "misplaced loyalism" since transferred to the British crown. The participation of Lowland and north-eastern gentry was less emphasised, while his Irish Jacobite advisors were presented as a largely negative influence on Charles in 1745.

Walter Scott, author of Waverley, a story of the 1745 rebellion, combined a romantic view of Jacobitism with an appreciation of the practical benefits of Union. In 1822 he arranged a pageantry of reinvented Scottish traditions for the visit of King George IV to Scotland. The displays of tartan proved immensely popular, and Highland clothing, previously associated with rebellion and disorder, became emblems of Scottish national identity. Some descendants of those attained for rebellion had their titles restored in 1824, while discriminatory laws against Catholics were repealed in 1829. With political Jacobitism now safely confined to an "earlier era", the hitherto largely ignored site of their final defeat at Culloden began to be celebrated.

Many Jacobite folk songs emerged in Scotland in this period; a number of examples were collected by Scott's colleague James Hogg in his Jacobite Reliques, including several he likely composed himself. Nineteenth century Scots poets such as Alicia Ann Spottiswoode and Carolina Nairne, Lady Nairne (whose "Bonnie Charlie" remains popular) added further examples. Relatively few of the surviving songs, however, actually date from the time of the risings; one of the best known is the Irish song "Mo Ghile Mear", which although a more recent composition is based on the contemporary lyric "Buan ar Buairt Gach Ló" by Seán Clárach Mac Domhnaill.

Neo-Jacobite revival 

There was a brief revival of political Jacobitism in the late 1880s and into the 1890s. A number of Jacobite clubs and societies were formed, starting with the Order of the White Rose founded by Bertram Ashburnham in 1886. In 1890, Herbert Vivian and Ruaraidh Erskine co-founded a weekly newspaper, The Whirlwind, that espoused a Jacobite political view. Vivian, Erskine and Melville Henry Massue formed the Legitimist Jacobite League of Great Britain and Ireland in 1891, which lasted for several years. Vivian went on to stand for Parliament four times on a Jacobite platform – though he failed to be elected each time. The revival largely came to an end with the First World War, and the various societies of the time are now represented by the Royal Stuart Society.

Claimants to the thrones of England, Scotland, Ireland and France

James II and VII (6 February 168516 September 1701).
James III and VIII (16 September 17011 January 1766), James Francis Edward Stuart, also known as the Chevalier de St. George, the King over the Water, or the Old Pretender. (Son of James II)
Charles III (31 December 172031 January 1788), Charles Edward Stuart, also known as Bonnie Prince Charlie, the Young Chevalier, or the Young Pretender. (Son of James III)
Henry IX and I (6 March 172513 July 1807), Henry Benedict Stuart, also known as the Cardinal King. (Son of James III)

Since Henry's death, none of the Jacobite heirs have claimed the English or Scottish thrones. Franz, Duke of Bavaria (born 1933), a direct descendant of Charles I, is the current legitimate heir of the house of Stuart. It has been suggested that a repeal of the Act of Settlement 1701 could allow him to claim the throne, although he has expressed no interest in doing so.

See also 
 List of movements that dispute the legitimacy of a reigning monarch
 Conservatism

Explanatory footnotes

Citations

Sources 

 
 .
 
 
 
 
 
 
 
 
 
 
 
 
 
 
 
 
 
 
 
 
 
 
 
 
 
 
 
 
 
 
 
 
 
 
 
 
 
 
 
 
 
 
 
 
 
 
 
 
 
 
 
 
 
 
 
 
 
 
 
 
 .

External links 
 BBC – Interactive Timeline of British History
 General History of the Highlands
 The University of Guelph Library, Archival and Special Collections, has more than 500 Jacobite pamphlets, histories, and literature in its rare books section introduced at UG Library: Archival and Special Collections – Jacobite Pamphlets
 Ascanius; or, the Young Adventurer

 
 
1688 establishments in England
1688 establishments in Ireland
1688 establishments in Scotland
James II of England
Political theories
Rival successions
Social movements in Ireland
Social movements in the United Kingdom